Robert Schatten (January 28, 1911 – August 26, 1977) was an American mathematician.

Robert Schatten was born to a Jewish family in Lviv. His intellectual origins were at Lwów School of Mathematics, particularly well known for fundamental contributions to functional analysis. His entire family was murdered during World War II, he himself emigrated to the United States.

In 1933 he got magister degree at Jan Kazimierz University of Lwów, and in 1939 he got master's degree at Columbia University. Supervised by Francis Joseph Murray, he got doctorate degree in 1942 for the thesis "On the Direct Product of Banach Spaces". Shortly after being appointed to a junior professorship, he joined the United States army where during training he suffered a back injury which affected him for the remainder of his life. In 1943 he was appointed to an assistant professorship at University of Vermont. At National Research Council, by two years he worked with John von Neumann and Nelson Dunford. In 1946, he went to the University of Kansas, first as extraordinary professor until 1952 and then as ordinary professor until 1961. He stayed at Institute for Advanced Study in 1950 and 1952–1953, at  University of Southern California in 1960–1961, and at State University of New York in 1961–1962. In 1962 he became professor at Hunter College, where he stayed until his death.

Schatten widely studied tensor products of Banach spaces. In functional analysis, he is the namesake of the Schatten norm and the Schatten class operators. His doctoral students included Elliott Ward Cheney, Jr. at University of Kansas, and Peter Falley and Charles Masiello at City University of New York.

Schatten died in New York City in 1977.

Further reading 

 A Theory of Cross-Spaces. Annals of Mathematics Studies, 
 Norm Ideals of Completely Continuous Operators. Ergebnisse der Mathematik und ihrer Grenzgebiete, 2. Folge,

References

External links 

Polish mathematicians
20th-century American mathematicians
1911 births
1977 deaths
20th-century Polish Jews
University of Kansas faculty
University of Southern California faculty
State University of New York faculty
Polish emigrants to the United States